The Spence Bridge Formation is a geologic formation in British Columbia. It preserves fossils dating back to the Cretaceous period.

See also

 List of fossiliferous stratigraphic units in British Columbia

References
 

Geologic formations of British Columbia
Lower Cretaceous Series of North America
Cretaceous British Columbia
Aptian Stage